Mundial de Fútbol is a football sports video game released for the Amstrad CPC, ZX Spectrum, MSX and MS-DOS platforms. It was created in 1990 by Opera Soft. Due to internal problems of the company it was released after the celebration of the 1990 FIFA World Cup.

Gameplay 
The simulation show an upper view with goals at the upper and lower parts of the screen (where the players reached through a tough scroll).

References

External links 

Game entry at worldofspectrum.org

1990 video games
ZX Spectrum games
Amstrad CPC games
Europe-exclusive video games
MSX games
DOS games
Association football video games
Video games developed in Spain